Scleritodermidae is a family of sea sponges.

Genera 
Aciculites Schmidt, 1879
Amphibleptula Schmidt, 1879
Microscleroderma Kirkpatrick, 1903
Pomelia Zittel, 1878
Scleritoderma Sollas, 1888
Setidium Schmidt, 1879

References
 

Tetractinellida
Taxa named by William Johnson Sollas